Sören Kaldma (born 3 July 1996) is an Estonian professional footballer who plays as a defensive midfielder for Estonian club FC Kuressaare.

International career
Kaldma made his senior international debut for Estonia on 19 November 2017, in a 2–0 away victory over Fiji in a friendly.

Honours

Club
Nõmme Kalju
Estonian Cup: 2014–15

References

External links

1996 births
Living people
Footballers from Tallinn
Estonian footballers
Association football defenders
Association football midfielders
Esiliiga players
Meistriliiga players
Nõmme Kalju FC players
Paide Linnameeskond players
Estonia youth international footballers
Estonia under-21 international footballers
Estonia international footballers